Mohammad Eslami (born 23 September 1956 In Isfahan) is the Vice President and Head of the Atomic Energy Organization in the government of President Raisi and was the Minister of Roads and Urban development and the Governor of Mazandaran in the government of President Rouhani.

References

1956 births
Living people
21st-century Iranian politicians
Presidents of the Atomic Energy Organization of Iran